Enreddy Prakash Reddy a.k.a. Om Sai Prakash is a Telugu and Kannada film director and producer. Born in Phirangipuram in Guntur district of Andhra Pradesh, he started as an assistant to Kodi Ramakrishna and then charted his own course in direction. He directed Maa Inti Aadapoduchu, Amma Leni Puttillu, Kodalu Diddina Kaapuram, Khaidi Garu, Amma Durgamma, Amma Nagamma, Pelli Aadu Choopista, Naga Devatha, etc. in Telugu.  He has a trademark of directing films with sentimental and devotional themes.
His films in Kannada, such as Anna Thangi, kitturina Huli, Thavarige Baa Thangi, and Golmaal Radhakrishna, were blockbusters in the Kannada film industry. He is married to Ms Rajamma. His son Sai Krishna Enreddy works as a publicity designer, actor and a director.

Filmography

References

External links
 

People from Guntur district
Kannada film producers
Telugu film directors
Film directors from Karnataka
Kannada film directors
Living people
Film producers from Karnataka
20th-century Indian film directors
Year of birth missing (living people)